The following is a list of the highest-grossing live-action/animated films, films that combine live action and animation characters. CGI characters are only included if they are portrayed as visually distinct from their live-action surroundings—otherwise, the majority of live-action movies which use CGI visual effects would be included.

Highest-grossing live-action/animated films
All of the films have had a theatrical run (including re-releases) since 1980, and films that have not played since then do not appear on the chart due to ticket-price inflation, population size and ticket purchasing trends not being considered.

2009, 2011, and 2016 are the most represented years on the list, with four films each.

Live action/computer animation

All of the films have had a theatrical run (including re-releases) since 1995, and films that have not played since then do not appear on the chart due to ticket-price inflation, population size and ticket purchasing trends not being considered. 2009 is the most frequent year with four films on the lost whiles Alvin and the Chipmunks is the most frequent franchises with 4 films on the list.

Live action/traditional animation

All of the films have had a theatrical run (including re-releases) since 1980, and films that have not played since then do not appear on the chart due to ticket-price inflation, population size and ticket purchasing trends not being considered. Looney Tunes is the most represented franchise with 3 films on the list.

Timeline
The following is a timeline of the highest grossing live action animated films since 1966.
Disney have held the record two times.
The Alvin and the Chipmunks film series is the only franchise to hold the record on more than one occasion, doing so two times.  Mary Poppins hold the record for the longest with 22 years.

Live action/computer animated

Live action/traditional animation

Opening weekend
The following is a timeline of the highest opening weekend live action animated films since 1986.

Highest-grossing live-action/animated film franchises and series

The following chart is a list of the highest-grossing live-action/animated film franchises. The Alvin & the Chipmunks franchise is the most successful, with worldwide box office totals of nearly $1.4 billion.
A given franchise needs to have at least 2 theatrically released films to be on this list. The Smurfs franchise has the highest per-film average, with nearly $455.7 million per film.

Live action/animated films by number of box office admissions 

The following table lists known estimated box office ticket sales for various high-grossing live action animated  films that have sold more than 1million tickets worldwide.

Note that some of the data are incomplete due to a lack of available admissions data from a number of countries. Therefore, it is not an exhaustive list of all the highest-grossing video game films by ticket sales, so no rankings are given.

Opening weekends
The following is a list of live action/animated  movies which have opened to more than $1 million.

  = North America only
^ = United Kingdom only.
! =  Austria only.
’= Brazil only

Opening weekends for Live action/traditional animation films
The following is a list of live action/animated  movies which have opened to more than $1 million.

Opening weekends for Live action/computer animation
The following is a list of Live action/computer animation movies which have opened to more than $1 million.

  = North America only
^ = United Kingdom only.
! =  Austria only.
’= Brazil only

See also
 List of highest-grossing animated films
 Lists of highest-grossing films

Notes

References

Films with live action and animation
Animated
Highest-grossing
Highest-grossing animated